Bahías de Huatulco International Airport  is an international airport located at Huatulco, in the state of Oaxaca, Mexico. The airport handles national and international air traffic for the southern and southeastern Pacific coast of Oaxaca state.

It is one of nine airports in southeast Mexico operated by Aeropuertos del Sureste (ASUR), which lists the airport's name as Huatulco International Airport. In 2021, the airport handled 692,150 passengers, and 971,035 in 2022, an increase of 40.29%.

Facilities

Airlines and destinations

Passenger

Statistics 
In recent years, it has become one of the fastest growing airports in the country thanks to new seasonal flights from Canada and the US, although the COVID-19 pandemic generated a temporary decrease in air traffic in 2020 and 2021, and a discontinuation of some international routes.

Passengers

Busiest routes

See also 

List of the busiest airports in Mexico

References

External links
 Huatulco Intl. Airport

Airports in Oaxaca